Elemental is a hip-hop group from Zagreb, Croatia, founded in 1998. By Luka Tralić Shot, Gordan Radočaj Ink and Mirela Priselac Remi, one of Croatia's few female rappers.

Awards

Discography
Moj, njegov i njen svijet (Kondorcomm, 2000)
Demiurg / Tempo velegrada (Menart Records, 2002)
Male stvari (Menart Records, 2004)
Pod pritiskom (Menart Records, 2008)
Vertigo (Menart Records, 2010)
U redu je (Menart Records, 2013)
Tijelo (383records, 2016)
ILICA (383records, 2020)

References

External links
Elemental Official Website, in Croatian.
Menart, band's releasing label 2002-2016

Croatian hip hop groups
Croatian rappers
Hayat Production artists
Musical groups established in 1998